Irumbai Mahaleswarar Temple is a Hindu temple located at Irumbai in Vanur taluk in Villupuram district, Tamil Nadu, India. The presiding deity is Shiva. He is called as Maakaleswarar. His consort is known as Kuyilmozhi Ammai.

Significance 
It is one of the shrines of the 275 Paadal Petra Sthalams - Shiva Sthalams glorified in the early medieval Tevaram poems by Tamil Saivite Nayanar Sambandar.

References 

Shiva temples in Viluppuram district
Padal Petra Stalam